The second season of the talent show competition series Indonesia's Got Talent premiered on SCTV on 5 April 2014, and concluded on 19 July 2014. This program is a franchise of the Got Talent series owned by Simon Cowell and the company SYCO. If the first season aired on Indosiar in 2010, and the second season was broadcast on SCTV in 2014.

Host & Judges 
Unlike previous seasons, all host and judges in this season are new.

Host 
 Evan Sanders
 Ibnu Jamil

Judges 
 Indy Barends
 Ari Lasso
 Anggun
 Jay Subiyakto

Sponsor 
 Mito
 Indomie
 Wardah
 Roma Biscuit

Season Overview

Semi finals

Semi-final 1 (23 May)

The 1st Semi-Final aired on 23 May 2014.

Semi-final 2 (30 May)

The 2nd Semi-Final aired on 30 May 2014

Semi-final 3 (7 June)

The 3rd Semi-Final aired on 7 June 2014.

Semi-final 4 (14 June)

The 4th Semi-Final aired on 14 June 2014

Semi-final 5 (21 June)

The 5th Semi-Final aired on 21 June 2014.

Semi-final 6 (28 June)

The 6th Semi-Final aired on 28 June 2014.

Grand Final

References

External links 
  
 https://musik.kapanlagi.com/galeri/berita-foto/indonesia/inilah-keempat-juri-indonesias-got-talent-2014.html
 https://www.kapanlagi.com/foto/berita-foto/indonesia/ariani-nisma-putri-tampil-jadi-pemenang-igt-2014.html
 https://www.tabloidbintang.com/foto/read/1319/ariani-putri-pemenang-indonesias-got-talent-2014
 https://m.tribunnews.com/seleb/2014/03/27/bisa-lihat-jay-subiyakto-menangis-hanya-di-indonesias-got-talent-2014
 https://www.liputan6.com/showbiz/read/2051921/jelang-semifinal-indonesias-got-talent-ari-lasso-dapat-kejutan

Got Talent
Indonesian reality television series
Television series by Fremantle (company)
2014 Indonesian television series debuts
2014 Indonesian television series endings
Indonesian television series based on British television series
SCTV (TV network) original programming